Myristica nana is a species of plant in the family Myristicaceae. It is endemic to Papua New Guinea.

References

Flora of Papua New Guinea
nana
Vulnerable plants
Endemic flora of Papua New Guinea
Taxonomy articles created by Polbot